Princess Royal was a large, frigate-built ship launched at Liverpool in 1783. She made four voyages as a slave ship in the triangular trade in enslaved people before she grounded in 1789 and was condemned.

Career
Princess Royal entered Lloyd's Register in 1783 with J. Forbes, master. However, Captain William Sherwood was Princess Royals master for the entirety of her career as a slaver. In a list of leading slave captains over the period 1785–1807, he placed fifth. He made 12 enslaving voyages for four owners, and in six vessels.

Sherwood made four voyages in Princess Royal in which he acquired captives primarily at the Bight of Biafra and Gulf of Guinea islands and took them to Havana.

First enslaving voyage (1785): Sherwood sailed from Liverpool on 27 March 1785. He acquired captives at Bonny Island and delivered 480 to Havana in October. Princess Royal had started the voyage with 50 crew men, 13 of whom died on the voyage. She arrived back at Liverpool on 1 December.

On her way, between Bonny and Princes Island, she had spoken , Sutton, master.

Second enslaving voyage (1786): Sherwood sailed from Liverpool on 20 March 1786. He again gathered his captives at Bonny and delivered 700 to Havana in October. Nine of Princess Royals 52 crew members died on the voyage. She left Havana on 28 October and arrived at Liverpool on 9 December.

Third enslaving voyage (1787): Sherwood sailed from Liverpool on 14 April 1787 and arrived at Bonny on 29 May. Princess Royal arrived at Havana on 27 September, where she landed 731 captives. Of her crew of 54 men, eight died on the voyage. She arrived back at Liverpool on 21 December.

The Slave Trade Act 1788 (Dolben's Act) limited the number of enslaved people that British enslaving ships could transport  without penalty, based on the ships' tons burthen. At a burthen of 600 tons, the cap for Princess Royal would have been 739 captives. It was the first British legislation passed to regulate slave shipping. 

Fourth enslaving voyage (1788–1789): Sherwood sailed from Liverpool on 10 April 1788 and arrived at Havana in September. He had embarked 771 captives, and landed 706, for a loss rate of 8.4%. Lloyd's List had reported that on 28 August 1788 Princess Royal had arrived at Trinidad with about 800 captives for Havana. Eight of Princess Royals 67 crew members died on the voyage. She sailed from Havana on 27 November, and arrived at Liverpool on 22 January 1789.

Fate
As Princess Royal returned from Havana a heavy gale on 24 January drove her from her moorings on to the shore, where she filled with water. She was surveyed and condemned.

Citations

References
 
 
 
 

1783 ships
Liverpool slave ships
Maritime incidents in 1789
Age of Sail merchant ships
Merchant ships of the United Kingdom